The Alarippu (meaning flowering bud) is traditionally the first dance piece that Bharatanatyam dancers learn and perform in this type of classical dance recital. The Alarippu was created in five different talas by the four brothers historical 

(verbal percussionist) and a mrudangist. While dancing this piece shows basic steps. It contains no abhinaya (facial expressions).  The act is entirely based on rhythm and is focused on relaxing the body of the dancer, thereby relaxing their mind and symbolizes their awakening.

References

Classical dance genres of India
Elements of a Bharatanatyam performance